William Patteson Nicholson (3 April 1876 – 29 October 1959) was a Presbyterian preacher and evangelist born in Bangor, County Down, Northern Ireland.

Nicknamed "the Tornado of the Pulpit", Nicholson spent his early years on his father's cargo ship.  He began to preach Christianity in 1899 at the age of 23 and was known for his "men-only" meetings. Nicholson used straightforward language which communicated to the common man.

In the Belfast shipyard of Harland & Wolff, a shed, named "the Nicholson shed", was erected to house stolen tools that newly converted workers were returning as a result of Nicholson's preaching.

Works

 Goodbye God: Twelve Stirring Messages (Stanley Barnes, 1998)

Bibliography
Barnes, Stanley All for Jesus: The Life of W.P. Nicholson, Ambassador Intl, 1996, 
Murray, S W W P Nicholson: Flame for God in Ulster, Presbyterian Fellowship, Belfast, 1973
Ravenhill, Leonard Billy Nicholson - The Irish Whitefield

References

1876 births
Irish Presbyterians
Irish Pentecostals
Irish evangelicals
Irish Protestant religious leaders
1959 deaths
Hellfire preachers